"(I'm Gonna) Put You Back on the Rack" is a song written by Randy Goodrum and Brent Maher, and recorded by American country music artist Dottie West.  The song peaked at number 16 on the Billboard Hot Country Singles chart.  It was released in June 1981 as the third and final single from West's album Wild West. In addition, "(I'm Gonna) Put You Back on the Rack" peaked at number 22 on the Canadian RPM Country chart.

Chart performance

References

1981 singles
1981 songs
Dottie West songs
Songs written by Randy Goodrum
Liberty Records singles
Songs written by Brent Maher